Merivale is an Australian privately held company, with property assets involved in the entertainment and hospitality sectors, predominantly in Sydney, New South Wales.

Fashion years 
It was founded in 1957 in Sydney by John and Merivale Hemmes, initially as a millinery in Sydney's Boulevard Arcade, later expanding into clothing. In 1959, the first House of Merivale fashion store was established in the Theatre Royal in Castlereagh Street. It expanded into a successful and influential high-fashion chain with three stores in Pitt Street, two in Melbourne and one in Canberra.

Hospitality and property diversification 
Merivale diversified into both hospitality and property interests, acquiring the Angel Hotel building in Pitt Street, which included a restaurant that reopened as a boutique, and was the first item in a substantial property portfolio.

It expanded further into hospitality in the early 1990s with the Merivale restaurant in Potts Point, as it began winding down its fashion interests, closing the last fashion outlet in 1996.

Hemmes' son, Justin, took over the business in the mid-1990s and aggressively diversified into hospitality, operating more than 70 nightclubs, pubs and restaurants, primarily in Sydney, by 2020. Notable assets include Hotel CBD, the Newport Arms Hotel and the Slip Inn.

In 2019 a class action was commenced against Merivale, alleging 129 million in under-payment of employees. Merivale denied the claims. , the matter is ongoing in the Federal Court.

References

External links

Clothing retailers of Australia
Companies based in Sydney
Defunct retail companies of Australia
Hospitality companies of Australia
Privately held companies of Australia
Australian companies established in 1957
Retail companies established in 1957